Ha-neul, also spelled Ha-nul, is a Korean unisex name. Unlike most Korean given names, which are composed of two single-syllable Sino-Korean morphemes each written with one hanja, Ha-neul is an indigenous Korean name: a single two-syllable word meaning "sky". As a name, it may loosely be interpreted as an exhortation to "spread your dreams high like the sky". It is one of a number of such native names (called 고유어 이름, goyueo ireum), along with others such as Seul-ki ("wisdom") and Sora ("conch shell"), which have become more popular in South Korea in recent decades.

In some cases, parents also choose to register hanja to represent these indigenous names, picking them solely for their pronunciation. However, this is difficult for the name Ha-neul because there is only one extremely rare character with the reading "neul", and it does not appear on the South Korean government's official list of hanja which may be registered for use in given names. Instead they must choose hanja which correspond to the homophonous but differently-spelled "Han-eul" (한을, for example  or ).

People
People with this name include:

Entertainment
Kim Ha-neul (born 1978), South Korean actress
Rottyful Sky, née Kim Ha-neul (1988–2013), South Korean female singer and composer
Kang Ha-neul (born 1990), South Korean actor

Sport
Kim Ha-neul (golfer) (born 1988), South Korean female golfer
Kwon Hah-nul (born 1988), South Korean female football player
Kim Ha-nul (figure skater) (born 2002), South Korean female figure skater

Fictional characters
Seo Ha-neul, female protagonist of 2006 South Korean television series One Fine Day
Jo Ha-neul, male character of 2016 South Korean television series Entertainer

See also
List of Korean given names

References

Korean unisex given names